Lazarevac is a municipality of the city of Belgrade. , the town has a total population of 25,526 inhabitants, while the municipal area has a total of 58,622 inhabitants.

Its name stems from the name of medieval Serbian ruler Prince Lazar Hrebeljanović.

History 
During the Interbellum, there was an auxiliary military airfield in Lazarevac, part of the air defense of the state capital, Belgrade.

On 7 April 1941, during the German bombing of Belgrade, air force unit "Arad", employing 60 Štuka airplanes bombed the airfield in an effort to destroy as many Yugoslav planes as possible. A majority of planes, used for training flights, were either destroyed or demolished; a total of nine airmen were killed in action. The Memorial Church of St.Demetrius, with ossuary, was also damaged in the attack.

The area of the former airfield is today occupied by the health center "Dr Đorđe Kovačević" and the Special Hospital for the endemic nephropathy, but neither the location nor the graves are marked in memory of the 1941 events. In 1984 one of the town streets was named after the killed airmen, albeit erroneously: instead of "Nine airmen", the street was named "Six airmen". In January 2018, dedication of the memorial plaque on the location of the former airfield was announced.

In 1971, the municipality of Lazarevac, along with Mladenovac, was annexed to the city of Belgrade.

Settlements
Aside from the town of Lazarevac, the municipality comprises the following settlements:

 Arapovac
 Barzilovica
 Baroševac
 Bistrica
 Brajkovac
 Burovo
 Cvetovac
 Čibutkovica
 Dren
 Dudovica
 Kruševica
 Junkovac
 Leskovac
 Lukavica
 Mali Crljeni
 Medoševac
 Mirosaljci
 Petka
 Prkosava
 Rudovci
 Sokolovo
 Stepojevac
 Strmovo
 Stubica
 Šopić
 Šušnjar
 Trbušnica
 Veliki Crljeni
 Vrbovno
 Vreoci
 Zeoke
 Županjac

The village of Sakulja was resettled in 1984. It was officially abolished in October 2019 and its territory was annexed to the neighboring Junkovac.

Demographics

The municipality of Lazarevac has a total population of 58,622 inhabitants, according to the 2011 census results.

Ethnic groups
The ethnic composition of the municipality:

Economy 
Lazarevac is the home to the Serbian largest coal mining and smelting complex RB Kolubara.

The following table gives a preview of total number of registered people employed in legal entities per their core activity (as of 2018):

Attractions 
One of the main attractions in Lazarevac is the Church of St. Demetrius. It is basically a mausoleum, a main memorial built in the memory of Serbian and Austro-Hungarian army soldiers that were killed at the Battle of Kolubara. 40,000 killed soldiers, both Serbian and Austro-Hungarian, were buried in the memorial ossuary of the church's crypt. It is the largest World War I necropolis in Serbia. "The Committee to raise a memorial church and crypt in Lazarevac" was established in order the build the church. In the 1937 Committee was disbanded and "The Society for raising a memorial church with crypt in Lazarevac" was formed instead, led by a priest Borivoje Đorđević. Finally, the temple was built by the Russian émigré architect Ivan Afanasjevič Rik between 1938 and 1941. In the architectural and urban environment of Lazarevac, the temple stands as a significant achievement of interwar Serbian church architecture.

There is also a Modern gallery in the town, with the rich collection of paintings, graphics and sculptures, the "Kamengrad" ("Stoneville"), a park enriched with the stone sculptures chiseled by Bogosav Živković, and a Cultural Center. Outside of the town there are three wooden churches from the 18th century, a spring of natural mineral water and several archaeological finds. Other touristic features in the vicinity of Lazarevac include the Ćelije monastery and the Vrače hill, where Dimitrije Tucović, Serbian socialist theorist, was killed in November 1914 during the Battle of Kolubara.

In Baroševac on the bank of the Kolubara grow a grove of giant sequoia trees which were brought from California to be studied and planted in Europe. The trees had only reached a height of 30m , and are continuing to be studied as they develop in this manufactured habitat.

There is a game hunting ground "Kolubara" in the municipality.

See also 

 Subdivisions of Belgrade
 List of Belgrade neighbourhoods and suburbs

References

External links 

 

 
Šumadija
Municipalities of Belgrade
Suburbs of Belgrade